Victoria Department is one of the departments of Entre Ríos Province, Argentina. The seat is at Victoria, Entre Ríos.

Departments of Entre Ríos Province